Lincoln Park High School may refer to:
 Lincoln Park High School (Chicago)
 Lincoln Park High School (Michigan)